Thomas Castella (born 30 June 1993) is a Swiss footballer who plays as a goalkeeper for FC Lausanne-Sport.

Junior at Team Friborg AFF / FFV, he subsequently trained at Neuchâtel Xamax. In June 2012, he transferred to Lausanne-Sport. During the season 2015-2016, he won the title of Swiss Challenge League and moved up to first Swiss division. During his second year at the highest level, he received, at mid-season, the distinction of best goalkeeper in Super League by the Blick. Unfortunately, he will not avoid the relegation of his team at the end of the season.

After two consecutive seasons in the Swiss second division, the FC Lausanne-Sport is back in swiss first division. Thomas Castella greatly contributes to the success of his team by making 14 shutouts in 30 games. He even received, in January 2020, during the SFL Award Night, the prize for best goalkeeper 2019 of the Brack Challenge League.

References

Swiss men's footballers
Swiss Super League players
Swiss Challenge League players
1993 births
Living people
FC Lausanne-Sport players
Association football goalkeepers
People from Fribourg
Sportspeople from the canton of Fribourg